Modern Outsider is a management company and independent record label founded by husband and wife team, Chip and Erin Adams, in October 2010 in Austin, Texas. Collectively, they have well over two decades of experience in various facets of the music industry, from radio promotion at Dangerbird Records, Capitol Records, The Syndicate and Cornerstone (agency) where they also handled digital marketing; they were in charge of editorial at the tastemaking site, TheTripwire.com. Their mission is simple: discover and release great music while building a tight-knit community for their artists.

In January 2016 the label was featured in Austin Monthly.

Modern Outsider was named the Record Label of the Year in 2016 by the Austin Chronicle.

Roster
 The Black and White Years
 Black Pistol Fire
 Brass Bed
 The Bright Light Social Hour
 The Calm Blue Sea
 The Crookes
 Curtis Roush
 Dana Falconberry
 Gliss (band)
Hard Proof
 Mirror Travel
 Moving Panoramas
 Pomegranates (band)
 Quiet Company
 Soft Swells
 Star Parks
 Tristen Gaspadarek
 Ume
 Walker Lukens

References

External links
 Official site
 SXSW - The Ume Train Keeps Rolling
 IFC - Exclusie Premiere - The Calm Blue Sea "Literal"
 Brooklyn Vegan - Ume Sign To Modern Outsider
 NPR First Listen: The Calm Blue Sea
 Buzzbands LA: Premiere: Soft Swells "Every Little Thing"
 SXSW - Outsiders Welcome At SXSW Music

See also 
 List of record labels

Alternative rock record labels
American independent record labels
Indie rock record labels